Jennie may refer to:

Arts and entertainment
 Jennie (film), a 1940 American drama film
 Jennie (musical), a 1963 Broadway production
 Jennie (novel), a 1994 science fiction thriller by Douglas Preston
 Jennie: Lady Randolph Churchill, a 1974 British television serial
 Jennie, a 1969/1971 two-volume biography of Lady Randolph Churchill by Ralph G. Martin

People
 Jennie (given name) or Jenny, a female given name
 Jennie (singer) (born 1996), South Korean singer with Blackpink

Places in the United States
 Jennie, Arkansas
 Jennie, Georgia
 Jennie, Minnesota

See also
 Jenni
 Jenny (disambiguation)